is a former Nippon Professional Baseball player.

External links

1978 births
Hosei University alumni
Japanese baseball coaches
Japanese baseball players
Living people
Nippon Professional Baseball catchers
Nippon Professional Baseball coaches
Nippon Professional Baseball infielders
Orix Buffaloes players
Osaka Kintetsu Buffaloes players
People from Kawasaki, Kanagawa
Saitama Seibu Lions players
Baseball people from Kanagawa Prefecture